Miyan Williams (born October 29, 2001) is an American football running back for the Ohio State Buckeyes.

High school career
Williams attended Winton Woods High School in Forest Park, Ohio. During his career, he had 5,823 rushing yards and 68 touchdowns. He originally committed to Iowa State University to play college football before changing his commitment to Ohio State University.

College career
As a true freshman at Ohio State in 2020, Williams played in four games and rushed 10 times for 64 yards. As a sophomore in 2021, he was a backup to TreVeyon Henderson and rushed for 508 yards on 71 carries and three touchdowns. He started 2022 in a tandem with Henderson.

Statistics

References

External links
Ohio State Buckeyes bio

Living people
Players of American football from Cincinnati
American football running backs
Ohio State Buckeyes football players
2001 births